Bernard Bamford Calvert (born 16 September 1942) is an English musician who played bass guitar and keyboards with The Hollies from 1966 until 1981.

Career
He worked with several rock and roll groups during the early 1960s, most notably Rickie Shaw and the Dolphins, where he worked with future Hollies members, Tony Hicks and Bobby Elliott. Originally a pianist, Calvert, on Hicks's suggestion, switched to bass.

After the break-up of the Dolphins, Calvert played in a number of semi-professional outfits. However, unable to advance his musical career, Calvert took a factory job until he was asked to substitute for Hollies' then bassist, Eric Haydock, in a tour of Scandinavia. After the tour, Calvert played on an Everly Brothers album, and on the Hollies' single, "Bus Stop", before returning to his factory job. Shortly after that, he was invited to join the Hollies permanently in 1966.

Calvert was friends with Mama Cass Elliot from The Mamas & the Papas.

On 24 September 2009, the Hollies were nominated for induction to the Rock and Roll Hall of Fame, and on 18 December 2009 were announced as inductees, to be inducted on 15 March 2010.  They were represented at the RRHOF ceremony by Clarke, Nash, Sylvester, Eric Haydock and Calvert. Bobby Elliott (drums) and Tony Hicks (guitar) were unable to attend because they had a prior booking with the Hollies.

Discography 

 For Certain Because (1966)
 Evolution (1967)
 Butterfly (1967)
 Hollies Sing Dylan (1969)
 Hollies Sing Hollies (1969)
 Confessions of the Mind (1970)
 Distant Light (1971)
 Romany (1972)
 Out on the Road (1973)
 Hollies (1974)
 Another Night (1975)
 Write On (1976)
 Russian Roulette (1976)
 A Crazy Steal (1978)
 Five Three One-Double Seven o Four (1979)
 Buddy Holly (1980)

See also
List of bass guitarists

References

1942 births
Living people
English rock bass guitarists
Male bass guitarists
English songwriters
People from Brierfield, Lancashire
The Hollies members
English rock keyboardists